National Highway 1B (NH 1B) was an Indian National Highway entirely within the union territory of Jammu and Kashmir.
 It has been renamed as National Highway 244.

Route
 Doda
 Kistwar
 Sinthan pass
 Hemis pass

See also
 List of National Highways in India (by Highway Number)
 List of National Highways in India
 National Highways Development Project

References

External links
 NH 1B on OpenStreetMap
 NH network map of India

1B
National highways in India (old numbering)